The Men's 1,500m T46 had its First Round held on September 9 at 9:55 and the Final on September 10 at 18:46.

Medalists

Results

References
Round 1 - Heat 1
Round 1 - Heat 2
Final

Athletics at the 2008 Summer Paralympics